Carson W. "Bill" Beck is a Tennessee politician who sits in the Tennessee House of Representatives representing District 51, which is composed of part of Davidson County. The 51st District includes Old Hickory, Madison, Inglewood, East Nashville, Downtown, The Gulch, Germantown, Salemtown and other neighborhoods. Representative Beck is a member of the Tennessee Democratic Party.

Early life and education
Representative Beck attended Belmont College where he received his bachelor's degree in Business Administration, in 1985. Representative Beck then attended Nashville School of Law, where he received his Doctor of Jurisprudence, in 1989.

Political career
During the Democrats primary election in 2014, Representative Beck won with 41.1% over Jennifer Buck Wallace with 34.6% and Stephen Fotopulos with 24.3%. In the general election, Representative Beck won with 71.8% over Republican challenger Brian L. Mason who received only 28.2% of the vote. Representative Beck defeated Trey Palmedo in the Democratic primary on August 2, 2018. Beck defeated independent candidate and father's rights advocate, Randell Stroud (Independent) on November 6, 2018, in the general election. Beck received 82% of the general vote whereas Stroud received 18% of the General vote.

April 2015 DUI Arrest
State Rep. Bill Beck's April 2015 DUI arrest video was released after DUI charges were dismissed during a hearing scheduled for July 2015. Along with allegedly driving under the influence, Beck was also charged with violating the state's implied consent law. The arresting officer allegedly spotted Beck driving "with the left tires completely in the center turn lane." The officer said Beck's eyes were bloodshot and watery, that he smelled of alcohol and that his speech was "extremely slurred." Beck denied having consumed any alcohol and the charges were dismissed; July 2015.

References

 http://www.nashvillescene.com/pitw/archives/2015/04/17/state-rep-bill-beck-busted-for-dui
 http://www.tennessean.com/story/news/local/davidson%20/2015/04/17/tennessee-rep-beck-arrested-dui/25925503/
 http://www.tennessean.com/story/news/politics/2015/07/29/watch-state-rep-bill-becks-dui-arrest/30815267/

External links
 Website
 Profile on Tennessee General Assembly website

1962 births
Living people
Democratic Party members of the Tennessee House of Representatives
21st-century American politicians